Hanancha, also Hannencha, is a town and commune in Souk Ahras Province in north-eastern Algeria.

References

Communes of Souk Ahras Province